St. Martin's was an electoral ward of Trafford covering the western part of Ashton upon Mersey in Sale, Greater Manchester, including the Ashton Village.

The ward was abolished in 2004, and its area split between the new Ashton upon Mersey, Bucklow-St. Martin's and St. Mary's wards.

Electoral history
Its electoral history since 1973 is as follows:

References

External links
Trafford Council

Wards of Trafford
1973 establishments in England